
Gmina Wyry (German: Wyrow) is a rural gmina (administrative district) in Mikołów County, Silesian Voivodeship, in southern Poland. The gmina also contains the village of Gostyń.

Neighbouring gminas
Gmina Wyry is bordered by the towns of Łaziska Górne, Mikołów, Orzesze and Tychy, and by the gmina of Kobiór.

Twin towns – sister cities

Gmina Wyry is twinned with:
 Medesano, Italy

References

Wyry
Mikołów County